The  was a denomination of Japanese yen. These coins were minted in gold, and during their lifespan were the highest denomination of coin that circulated in the country. The first coins were minted in 1870 following the introduction of a decimal currency system. Twenty Yen coins spanned three different Imperial eras before mintage was halted in 1932. Many of these coins were then melted or destroyed as a result of the wars between 1931 and 1945. These coins are now collected by numismatists for academic study, and by those with a hobby.

History
In November 1869, new units of yen were established in the form of a metric system. During this time it was decided that silver would become the standard unit of value leaving gold coinage as a subsidiary. The Japanese government considered adopting the gold standard as early as December 1870 after hearing about its implementation in the United States. This system was officially put into place on May 10, 1871 setting standards for the 20 yen coin. Gold coinage eventually ground to a halt within a few years as coinage regulations that had been put into place were not sufficient to maintain a healthy growth of gold monometallism. This was in part due to the issuance of large amounts of in-convertible paper currency which drove gold coins out of the country. Coinage of the 20 yen piece had all but stopped by 1877, and those struck in 1880 were only done so as part of presentation sets for visiting dignitaries and heads of state.

New coinage reform was adopted on March 26, 1897 which re-established the gold 20 yen coin. These new standards lowered both the size and weight of the coin, the new diameter was set at 28.78mm (previously 35.06mm), and the weight was lowered from 33.3g down to 16.6g. Over 1.5 million coins were struck during this year before production ceased until 1904. Coinage of 20 yen pieces then continued past the reign of Emperor Meiji, into the reign of Emperor Taishō where coinage stopped in 1920. The decision to stop minting 20 yen pieces came as Japan's gold reserves were quickly depleted from excess imports. These reserves were eventually stabilized and coinage started again in 1930. By this time though, the gold coins minted were described as "not in general use". 

This resumed coinage was brief under Emperor Shōwa as Japan abandoned the gold standard in December 1931. The reasons behind this move were that Japan's gold reserves were again being depleted, and allowing the yen to depreciate would help the economy which was struggling at the time. Gold coins of the 20 yen denomination were last minted in 1932, it is unknown how many Shōwa era coins were later melted. Some of these coins were kept away in bank vaults for decades before being released as part of a hoard in the mid 2000s.

Weight and size

Circulation figures

Meiji

The following are mintage figures for the coins that were minted between the 3rd and 45th (last) year of Meiji's reign. Inscriptions on coins for this period all begin with the Japanese symbol 明治 (Meiji). While coins were struck in 1892, none were released for circulation.

Japanese coins from this period are read clockwise from right to left
"Year" ← "Number representing year of reign" ← "Emperors name" (Ex: 年 ← 七十三 ← 治明)

Taishō
The following are mintage figures for the coins that were minted from the 1st to the 9th year of Taishō's reign. Inscriptions on coins for this period all begin with the Japanese symbol 大正 (Taishō).

Japanese coins from this period are read clockwise from right to left: 
"Year" ← "Number representing year of reign" ← "Emperors name" (Ex: 年 ← 六 ← 正大)

Shōwa 

The following are mintage figures for coins minted between the 5th and the 7th year of Emperor Shōwa's reign. Inscriptions on coins of this period all begin with the Japanese symbol 昭和 (Shōwa).

Japanese coins from this period are read clockwise from right to left: 
"Year" ← "Number representing year of reign" ← "Emperors name" (Ex: 年 ← 五 ← 和昭)

Collecting
  

The value of any given coin is determined by survivability rate and condition as collectors in general prefer uncleaned appealing coins. For this denomination all 20 yen coins are scarce as the amount remaining today are dependent on how many were saved or kept away. Early Meiji era coins with the first design are now considered rare due to their low mintages. These coins which are dated from 1870 to 1876 (year 3 to 9) are all priced in five digit dollar amounts (USD) in average condition. The rarest of these early coins are dated 1877 and 1880 (year 10 to 13) as one has an extremely low mintage, while the other was not meant for general circulation. Twenty yen coins dated 1877 (year 10) have an extremely low mintage of just 29 coins struck. Of those available to collectors just 1 mint state example is recorded by PCGS. Coins dated 1880 (year 13) were only released as part of presentation sets that were widely destroyed or melted down between 1931 and 1945. An auction held in 2011 featuring one of these coins sold it for $230,000 (USD). Less than 10 coins dated 1880 (year 13) of the original mintage of 103 are thought to exist today.

Millions of minted coins were recorded during the Shōwa era, but it is unclear how many of these coins survived. Examples from Shōwa's 7th year of reign (1932) were once considered to be virtually unknown until a hoard was discovered in the mid 2000s. Between 2005 and 2007 the Ministry of Finance released over 30,000 gold coins of 5, 10 and 20 Yen denominations that had been kept in vaults. It is recommended by those in the numismatic field that all 20 yen coins be authenticated first by an expert, as counterfeits exist.

See also

Double eagle
Gold coin
Gold as an investment

Notes

References

Japanese yen coins
Twenty-base-unit coins
Gold coins